The tulum is a musical instrument, a form of bagpipe from the Black Sea region of Turkey. It is droneless with two parallel chanters, and is usually played by the Laz, Black sea Turks, Hemshin peoples and by Pontic Greeks, particularly Chaldians. It is a prominent instrument in the music of Pazar, Hemşin, Çamlıhemşin, Ardeşen, Fındıklı, Arhavi, Hopa, some other districts of Artvin and in the villages of the Tatos range (the watershed between the provinces of Rize and Trabzon) of İspir. It is the characteristic instrument of the transhumant population of the northeastern provinces of Anatolia and, like the kemençe in its area, the tulum imposes its style on all the dance and entertainment music of those for whom it is "our music".

Terminology
Some of the names of bagpipes from the Near East include:
Guda (Laz)
Gudast'vri, გუდასტვირი (Georgian)
Ç'ip'oni (Artvin, Adjara, Lazona)
Dankio (Pontic Greek, Romeika)
Parkapzuk, Պարկապզուկ (Armenian)
Shuvyr (Mari people), North Circassians)
Sahbr, Shapar (Chuvash)
Tulum (Azerbaijani, Turkish).

Etymology
Turkish tulum is "a skin container".

See also
Dankiyo
Tulum-zurna
Hemshin peoples
List of bagpipes

Notes

External links
Tulum of Pontic People at Pontian.info
Pontic music and dance samples at Karalahana.com
Short recording of tulum at Discover Turkey
Tulum at Discover Turkey
Gudachiben at Hangebi.ge
Pontic Angeion (Touloum)

Bagpipes
Azerbaijani musical instruments
Turkish folk music instruments
Musical instruments of Georgia (country)
Turkish words and phrases
Laz musical instruments
Pontic Greek musical instruments